A grandpa is a male grandparent.

Grandpa, grampa, or granpa may also refer to:

Places
 Tsiatsan or Grampa, a town in the Armavir Province of Armenia

Titles or names in entertainment
 Grandpa, a character and Juni's grandfather in the Spy Kids franchise
 Granpa, an animated film starring Peter Ustinov and Sarah Brightman
 Grandpa (The Munsters), television series character
 Grampa Simpson, television series character, in The Simpsons
 Grandpa (Tell Me 'Bout the Good Ol' Days), song by The Judds
 Grandpa (comics), a comic strip that ran in British comic book magazine The Beano
 Grandpa, film character, from The Texas Chainsaw Massacre
 Grandpa, television series character, from Caillou
 Stanley "Grandpa" Kanisky, a character on the American television sitcom Gimme a Break

Nicknames
Nickname of Alex Dickerson (born 1990), American baseball player

See also
Granddad (disambiguation)